The Lemke–Howson algorithm is an algorithm that computes a Nash equilibrium of a bimatrix game, named after its inventors, Carlton E. Lemke and J. T. Howson.
It is said to be "the best known among the combinatorial algorithms for finding a Nash equilibrium", although more recently the Porter-Nudelman-Shoham algorithm has outperformed on a number of benchmarks.

Description

The input to the algorithm is a 2-player game G.
G is represented by two m × n game matrices A and B, containing
the payoffs for players 1 and 2 respectively, who have m and n pure strategies respectively.
In the following we assume that all payoffs are positive. (By rescaling, any
game can be transformed to a strategically equivalent game with positive payoffs.)

G has two corresponding polytopes (called the best-response polytopes)
P1 and P2, in m dimensions and n dimensions respectively, defined as follows.

P1 is in Rm; let {x1,...,xm} denote the coordinates.
P1 is defined by m inequalities xi ≥ 0, for all i ∈ {1,...,m},
and a further n inequalities
B1,jx1+...+Bm,jxm ≤ 1,
for all j ∈ {1,...,n}.

P2 is in Rn; let {xm+1,...,xm+n} denote the coordinates.
P2 is defined by n inequalities xm+i ≥ 0, for all i ∈ {1,...,n},
and a further m inequalities
Ai,1xm+1+...+Ai,nxm+n ≤ 1,
for all i ∈ {1,...,m}.

P1 represents the set of unnormalized probability distributions over player 1's
m pure strategies, such that player 2's expected
payoff is at most 1. The first m constraints require the probabilities to be
non-negative, and the other n constraints require each of the n pure strategies of
player 2 to have an expected payoff of at most 1.
P2 has a similar meaning, reversing the roles of the players.

Each vertex v of P1 is associated with a set of labels from the set
{1,...,m + n} as follows.
For i ∈ {1, ..., m}, vertex v gets the label i if xi = 0 at vertex v.
For j ∈ {1, ..., n}, vertex v gets the label m + j if B1,jx1 + ... + Bm,jxm = 1.
Assuming that P1 is nondegenerate, each vertex is incident to m
facets of P1 and has m labels.
Note that the origin, which is a vertex of P1, has the labels {1, ..., m}.

Each vertex w of P2 is associated with a set of labels from the set
{1, ..., m + n} as follows.
For j ∈ {1, ..., n}, vertex w gets the label m + j if xm+j = 0 at vertex w.
For i ∈ {1, ..., m}, vertex w gets the label i if
Ai,1xm+1 + ... + Ai,nxm+n = 1.
Assuming that P2 is nondegenerate, each vertex is incident to n
facets of P2 and has n labels.
Note that the origin, which is a vertex of P2, has the labels {m + 1, ..., m + n}.

Consider pairs of vertices (v,w), v ∈ P1, w ∈ P2.
We say that (v,w) is completely labeled if the sets associated with v and w
contain all labels {1, ..., m + n}. Note that if v and w are the origins of Rm and Rn
respectively, then (v,w) is completely labeled.
We say that (v,w) is almost completely labeled (with respect to some missing label g)
if the sets associated with v and w
contain all labels in {1, ..., m + n} other than g.
Note that in this case, there will be a duplicate label that is associated with both
v and w.

A pivot operation consists of taking some pair (v,w) and replacing v with some
vertex adjacent to v in P1, or alternatively replacing w with some
vertex adjacent to w in P2. This has the effect (in the case that
v is replaced) of replacing some label of v with some other label.
The replaced label is said to be dropped. Given any label of v, it is possible
to drop that label by moving to a vertex adjacent to v that does not contain the
hyperplane associated with that label.

The algorithm starts at the completely labeled pair (v,w) consisting of the pair of
origins. An arbitrary label g is dropped via a pivot operation, taking us to
an almost completely labeled pair (v′,w′). Any almost completely labeled pair
admits two pivot operations corresponding to dropping one or other copy of its
duplicated label, and each of these operations may result in another almost completely
labeled pair, or a completely labeled pair. Eventually the algorithm finds a
completely labeled pair (v*,w*), which is not the origin.
(v*,w*) corresponds to a pair of unnormalised probability distributions
in which every strategy i of player 1 either pays that player 1, or pays less than 1 and is played
with probability 0 by that player (and a similar observation holds for
player 2). Normalizing these values to probability distributions, we have a Nash
equilibrium (whose payoffs to the players are the inverses of the normalization
factors).

Properties

The algorithm can find at most n + m different Nash equilibria. Any choice of
initially-dropped label determines the equilibrium that is eventually found by
the algorithm.

The Lemke–Howson algorithm is equivalent to the following homotopy-based approach.
Modify G by selecting an arbitrary pure strategy g, and giving the player who owns
that strategy, a large payment B to play it. In the modified game, that strategy g
is played with probability 1, and the other player will play his best response
to g with probability 1. Consider the continuum of games in which B is
continuously reduced to 0. There exists a path of Nash equilibria connecting
the unique equilibrium of the modified game, to an equilibrium of G.
The pure strategy g chosen to receive the bonus B corresponds to the
initially dropped label.

While the algorithm is efficient in practice, in the worst case the number
of pivot operations may need to be exponential in the number of pure strategies
in the game.

Subsequently, it has been shown that it is PSPACE-complete to find any of the solutions
that can be obtained with the Lemke–Howson algorithm.

References

Game theory
Non-cooperative games
Combinatorial algorithms